Harrison Bay may refer to:
in Canada
Harrison Bay (British Columbia), on the Harrison River at the Fraser River

in the United States
Harrison Bay (Beaufort Sea), a bay on the north coast of Alaska, location of an island named for George Baker Leavitt, Sr.
Harrison Bay, in Harrison Bay State Park, on Chickamauga Lake, Tennessee, named for submerged, former Harrison, Tennessee